The Battle of Strumica took place in August 1014, near Strumica (or Strumitsa), present-day North Macedonia, between Bulgarian and Byzantine forces. For nearly three and a half centuries Bulgaria has threatened the Byzantine Empire's sole rule in the Balkan Peninsula. Making the Bulgars enemy number one of the Byzantines for centuries. In the eighth century, Byzantine emperors Constantine V and Irene had some success by pushing back into their territory, Thrace. That success was short lived however, when the Byzantine emperor Nikephorus I had died in battle against the Bulgarians. Nikephorus I was the first Byzantine emperor to die in battle since the emperor Valens in 378. As a result of Nikephorus I death the Byzantines hit a major setback, and the lands that the Byzantines had recovered were lost. Then when the Bulgar Khan Boris converted to Christianity there was a brief period of diplomacy and even a formal peace in 927. More setbacks would occur for the Byzantines in 971, and it would ultimately take the Byzantines over a hundred years to defeat the Bulgarians. Under the Tsar Samuel, Bulgarian power had been reconstituted. From 977 to 986 Samuel had reinforced Bulgaria's power by liberating Danubian Bulgaria, conquering Macedonia and Thessaly, and even forcing his way into the Peloponnesus. The Tsar Samuel managed to extend the Bulgarian empires borders from the Danube to the Adriatic. Due to this strengthening of the Bulgarian empire, Bulgaria became the only foreign power which was capable enough to permanently threaten the Byzantine capital immediately due to its geographical location. This resulted in the Byzantine emperor Basil II to go on the offensive and push his army into Bulgaria; however, Basil II suffered a defeat at the pass of the Trajan Gate in the Balkans putting a ten-year halt on his campaign into Bulgaria. The Tsar Samuel took advantage of this ten-year hiatus by continuing to add to the size of his kingdom by extending Bulgaria's borders to the Aegean Sea. Bulgarian expansion was so successful and uncontested at this time due largely to the fact that Constantinople was preoccupied dealing with the Arab threat to its possessions in Asia Minor. The Tsar Samuel's recent victories were short lived; however, now that the Arab threat had been dealt with, Byzantine emperor Basil II was now able to focus his full attention on the Bulgarian uprisings. Basil II conquests into Bulgaria took most of his reign to complete, but with it came many new lands and territories, as well as an end to the Bulgarian threat that had plagued the Byzantines for centuries. The first Bulgarian state was nearing its end when the Bulgarian and Byzantine armies met in Macedonia in 1014. On the slopes of Mount Belassitsa fifteen thousand Bulgarian troops were captured; ninety-nine out of every one hundred captured Bulgarians was blinded, leaving the remainder who were left with one eye, to guide their fellow comrades back to their leader who died three days after seeing what had happened to his soldiers.  Bulgarian troops under Emperor Samuil's son Gavril Radomir defeated the army of the governor of Thessaloniki, Theophylactus Botaniates, who perished in the battle. After his death the Byzantine Emperor Basil II was forced to pull back from Bulgaria and was unable to take advantage of his success in the recent Battle of Kleidion.

The battle 

After his victory on 29 July 1014, when a large part of the Bulgarian army was destroyed, Basil II marched westwards and seized the small fortress of Matsukion near Strumitsa, but the town itself remained in Bulgarian hands. That is why the Byzantine Emperor sent an army led by one of his most capable generals, Theophylactus Botaniates, to destroy the palisades to the south of the town, which had been built by Samuil before the campaign. Thus, he would clear the way of the Byzantines to Thessaloniki through the valley of the Vardar river.

The historian Vasil Zlatarski specifies the battlefield at the Kosturino gorge between the mountains Belasitsa and Plavush. The Byzantines could not organize their defense in the narrow pass and were annihilated. Most of their troops perished including their commander. According to bishop Michael of Devol, Botaniates was killed by the heir to the Bulgarian throne Gavril Radomir, who pierced the Byzantine general with his spear. Upon the news of that unexpected and heavy defeat, Basil II was forced to immediately retreat eastwards and not through the planned route via Thessaloniki. He also lifted the siege of Strumitsa. In order to break the spirit of the Bulgarians, Basil II blinded thousands of soldiers previously captured at Kleidion and sent them to Samuil.

References

Sources 

 John Skylitzes. Synopsis Historion, translated by Paul Stephenson.
 Подбрани извори за българската история, Том II: Българските държави и българите през Средновековието, Изд. "ТАНГРА ТанНакРа ИК", София 2004, с. 66-67
 Мутафчиев, Петър, Книга за българите, Издателство на БАН, София 1992, с. 118-119
 Златарски, Васил, История на българската държава през средните векове, том 1, част 2, Академично издателство "Марин Дринов", София 1994,  (т. 1, ч. 2), с. 738 (с. 697-700 в електронно издание)
 Пириватрич, Сърджан, Самуиловата държава. Обхват и характер, Изд. група "АГАТА-А", София 2000, с. 137
 Гюзелев, Васил, България от втората четвърт на Х до началото на ХІ век, с. 71, 74, в: Димитров, Илчо (ред.), Кратка история на България, изд. "Наука и изкуство", София 1983
 Zlatarski, Vasil, History of Bulgaria in the Middle Ages (Istoria na balgarskata darzhava prez srednite vekove, История на българската държава през средните векове), in Bulgarian, Vol. 1, Part 2, Marin Drinov Academic Publishers, Sofia, 1994,  (That work can be found in the Internet, taken from the site "Books for Macedonia" (in Bulgarian)  on 29.01.2008)
 Gyuzelev, Vasil, Bulgaria from the second quarter of the tenth century to the beginning of the 11th century, (Balgaria ot vtorata chetvart na X do nachaloto na XI vek, България от втората четвърт на Х до началото на ХІ век), in Bulgarian, In: Dimitrov, Ilcho (Ed.), Short History of Bulgaria (Kratka istoria na Balgaria, Кратка история на България), in Bulgarian, Science and Arts Publishers, Sofia 1983

1010s in the Byzantine Empire
11th century in Bulgaria
Battles involving the First Bulgarian Empire
Strumica
Military history of North Macedonia
Conflicts in 1014
1014 in Europe
Strumica Municipality